Meerut College is a state-funded college in Meerut, Uttar Pradesh, India. The college is affiliated to Chaudhary Charan Singh University, Meerut. The college has glorious history of achievements in academics and other fields. Personalities from Prime Minister, Governors, Ambassadors, Cabinet Ministers, Member's of Parliament, State Assemblies, Judges, innumerable Administrators IAS, IFS, IRS, National Poets, Advocates, Social Workers, Scientists, leading Industrialist and Educationists have been students of this college.

Academics 
The college offers undergraduate and postgraduate courses in science, arts, commerce, education, computer science and law in affiliation to Chaudhary Charan Singh University. The college also offers PhD. courses in the same fields.
The college provides a master's degree in journalism and mass communication in affiliation to Chaudhary Charan Singh University. The college also offers an MBA in affiliation to Mahamaya Technical University, Gautam Buddha Nagar.

The college is a study center for Indira Gandhi National Open University offering bachelors, masters and diploma courses.

The college also offers separate hostel facilities to its male and female students. It also has several practical labs, and educational complexes.

Fee Structure 
It is a state funded college so the fee is minimal and meritious students also get scholarships.

National Cadet Corps 
It has 70 UP BN NCC & 2 UP ARM SQ and total 208 cadets (SD &SW) are enrolled in NCC.

70 UP BN NCC (Total Strength - 104) 
ANO - Dr.(Capt.) Awdhesh Kumar

2 UP ARM SQ (Total Strength - 104) 
ANO - Dr.(Maj.) Paramjeet Singh

Notable alumni 
 Late Chaudhary Charan Singh - Former Prime Minister of India
 Late Kunwar Mahmud Ali Khan Former Governor Madhya Pradesh [ M P Raj Bhavan official website]
 Murli Manohar Joshi  - former Union Human Resource Development Minister of India
 Late Jagmohanlal Sinha - Indian Judge whose decision in State of Uttar Pradesh v. Raj Narain led to the declaration of emergency
 Late Akhtar Hameed Khan - Pakistani Development and Social Activist
 Late Prof. K. A. Nizami Indian ambassador to Syria (1975-1977).
 Kushal Pal Singh - Chairman and CEO of DLF Limited
 Jameel Jalibi - Former Vice-Chancellor of Karachi University
 Late Virendra Verma - Former Governor of Punjab, Administrator of Chandigarh and Governor of Himachal Pradesh
 Virendra Singh, theoretical physicist and Shanti Swarup Bhatnagar laureate
Intizar Hussain (1925-2016), leading literary figure from Pakistan. Author of Basti and Naya Gar
S. Irfan Habib, noted historian
 Amrish Tyagi - Founder and CEO at Webindia Master

References

www.meerutcollegeup.blogspot.com/?m=1

Universities and colleges in Meerut
Chaudhary Charan Singh University
Educational institutions established in 1892
1892 establishments in India